Burmese rosewood is a common name for several plants and may refer to:
Dalbergia oliveri
Dalbergia bariensis
Pterocarpus indicus